Marching Powder may refer to:

 Bolivian marching powder or Peruvian marching powder, euphemisms for cocaine
 Marching Powder (book), a 2003 book by Rusty Young based on the experiences of convicted drug-trafficker Thomas McFadden
 Marching Powder, a track on Tommy Bolin's 1975 album, Teaser